The Jalisco shrew  (Sorex mediopua) is a species of mammal in the family Soricidae. It is found in southern Mexico.

References

Sorex
Fauna of Mexico
Mammals described in 2007